Śląska Ochla is a river of Poland. It flows into the Oder near Bobrowniki.

Rivers of Poland
Rivers of Lubusz Voivodeship